The Mundo is a river in south-eastern Spain. It originates slightly south of Riópar in the mountain plateau Calar del Mundo. From there it flows towards Riopar and then westwards until it joins the Segura south of Hellín.

Description
The Mundo has a length of 150 km and a drainage area of 766 km2. The river receives most of its tributaries in  its upper course. They include the Rio de la Vega, the Rio de los Vadillos and the Rio de Bogarra. The  Arroyo de Tobarra is the only significant tributary in its lower course. There are two reservoirs along the coursenthe Mundo, the Talave reservoir with a volume of 34  cubic hectometres and the Camarillas reservoir with a volume of 36.5 cubic hectometres. At the Talave reservoir the Mundo receives additional water via a 250 km long aqueduct coming from reservoirs of the Tagus river. The Camarillas reservoir triggered a series of small quakes when it was first filled in spring 1961, but the seismic activity finally ceased in spring 1962.

The Mundo river is well known for its picturesque source (Reventón del Rio Mundo), which is considered to be one of the world's most beautiful river sources. The river originates from a cave in the middle of a tall cliff and forms a waterfall with a height of almost 100 meters. Subsequently, it forms a series of smaller cascades and pools. The cave itself is about 15 meters wide and 25 meters high and constitutes the end of a large cave system under the Calar del Mundo.

See also 
 List of rivers of Spain

References

Rivers of Spain
Rivers of Castilla–La Mancha